he Campeonato Brasileiro de League of Legends (CBLOL, lit. Brazilian Championship of League of Legends) is the top level of professional League of Legends competition in Brazil. There are ten teams in the league. Each annual season of play is divided into two splits, spring and summer, both consisting of ten rounds of round-robin tournament play, which then conclude with play-off tournaments between the top three teams. The winners of each split qualifies for the Mid-Season Invitational and World Championship.

The matches have been held since 2015 at Riot studios in São Paulo and broadcast via livestream, with an audience. And for the finals the matches are held in arenas like Allianz Parque, and are attended by narrators, commentators, analysts and presenters. In addition to full broadcasting on official YouTube channels, Twitch, and since 2017 CBLOL has also been playing live games on SporTV, with the same coverage as Riot.

Overview

The tournament has been organized since 2012, shortly after the debut of the Brazilian server, with professionalism still incipient, when it was held in just three days. In 2014, the first league championship was held: the Brazilian League - Champions Series, and in the same year the precedent of two annual competitions was inaugurated, with the holding of the Brazilian Regional Final. Since then, the two-splits format has been adopted, with each one played in the first phase in the "all against all" format, and later knockout until the grand finale. Also in 2015 the league format with stable members was adopted, but subject to lowering and promotion of the worst placed to benefit the best of the Challenging Circuit. Until 2014, a qualifying phase for the championship dispute was adopted.

On 21 January 2020, Riot Brazil confirms CBLOL is moved to franchising.

Format 

 10 teams participate
 10 weeks, League play
 Triple Round Robin
 Matches are best of one
 Advancement:
 Top six teams advance to Playoffs
 7th - 10th don't advance to Playoffs
 Ties are broken by the following methods:
 Head-to-head record during regular season
 Shortest combined game time (for the team's wins)
 If still tied, a tiebreaker game will be played

Teams 
Source:

Past seasons

Number of top four finishes 
<onlyinclude>
 Denotes a team that no longer participates in the league.

References

External links 
 

League of Legends competitions
Recurring sporting events established in 2012
Sports leagues in Brazil